Royd House is a Grade I listed building in Hale, Greater Manchester. It was designed by architect Edgar Wood as his own home and was built between 1914 and 1916. The building is regarded as one of the most advanced examples of early twentieth century domestic architecture. It is one of six Grade I listed buildings in Trafford.

Royd House is a 2-storey, y-shaped building with a concrete roof. It has a concave façade and is faced in Portland red stone and Lancashire brick.

See also

Grade I listed buildings in Greater Manchester
Listed buildings in Hale, Greater Manchester

References

Grade I listed buildings in Greater Manchester
Buildings and structures in Trafford
Houses completed in 1916